Abnow or Ab-e Now or Abnu may refer to:
 Abnow, Fars
 Ab-e Now, Farashband, Fars Province
 Abnow, Razavi Khorasan